Frank Caleb Gates (September 12, 1887, Chicago – March 31, 1955) was an American botanist and plant ecologist. He was the president of the Ecological Society of America (ESA) in 1952.

Biography
He graduated in 1910 with an A.B. from the University of Illinois and in 1912 with a Ph.D. from the University of Michigan, where he was strongly influenced by Henry A. Gleason. Gates's dissertation Winter as a factor in the xerophily of certain evergreen plants was supervised by Frederick Charles Newcombe. From 1912 to 1915 Gates was an instructor at the University of the Philippines. He went on a surveying expedition in the Philippines. In June 1915 he married Margaret "Madge" Murray Thompson (1887–1964). From 1916 to 1919 he was a professor at Carthage College. During WW I, he was in 1918 a 2nd lieutenant in the U.S. Army Sanitary Corps. At Kansas State Agricultural College (now named Kansas State University), Gates was from 1919 to 1922 an assistant professor, from 1922 to 1928 an associate professor, and from 1928 until his death in 1955 a full professor. From 1915 to 1954 he taught during the summers at the University of Michigan Biological Station (UMBS), located on the south shore of Douglas Lake in Cheboygan County, Michigan.

Gates was an expert on Michigan and Kansas vegetation. He did research on ecology, revegetation and succession, and, in particular, how winter affects the xerophily of some evergreen species.

In 1921 he was elected a Fellow of the American Association for the Advancement of Science. In 1941 he was the president of the Kansas Academy of Science.

Frank C. Gates and his wife were the parents of David Murray Gates (1921–2016) and Margaret E. Gates (1923–2013).

Selected publications
 
 
 
 
 
 
 
 
  p. 596
 
 
 
 
  p. 149 (See atmometer.)
 
 
  p. 450

References

External links

1887 births
1955 deaths
20th-century American botanists
Plant ecologists
University of Illinois alumni
University of Michigan alumni
Kansas State University faculty
Fellows of the American Association for the Advancement of Science